Sina Bank (Bank Sina) is a private Iranian banking establishment offering retail, commercial and investment banking services. The company was established in 1985 as a part of the government's privatization of the banking system.

While established in Tehran, the bank operated throughout the nation with 1998 employees and 253 branches.

Sina Bank is listed under the Tehran Stock Exchange and is currently one of eight private banks in Iran. The bank is currently the 64th largest company in Iran. In 2007, Sina Bank had initial equity capital of  10 Billion IRR.

Operations
The bank was established in 1985 as the Bonyad Finance and Credit Company. The company was the first credit establishment in the Iranian financial sector. In 2007, the company was privatized, and in 2009 was listed on the Tehran Stock Exchange.

The bank currently operates throughout the country, housing a total of 253 branches. In 2010, the bank came under European Union sanctions against Iranian banking institutions.

In addition to offering short and fixed deposit accounts for domestic and overseas clients, the bank provides letters of credit, treasury, currency exchange, corporate loans syndication, financial advisory and electronic banking services.

See also

Banking in Iran

References

External links
 

Banks of Iran
Banks established in 1985
Companies listed on the Tehran Stock Exchange
Iranian companies established in 1985
Iranian entities subject to the U.S. Department of the Treasury sanctions